WRC 7, also known as WRC 7 FIA World Rally Championship, is a racing video game based on the 2017 World Rally Championship season. The game was developed by French developer Kylotonn and published on 15 September 2017 by Bigben Interactive for Microsoft Windows, PlayStation 4 and Xbox One. The game carries an official FIA esports licence.

Reception

The game was released to mixed reception, with reviewers praising improvements over its predecessor but criticised the game's controls and lack of depth compared to the likes of DiRT 4. Metacritic gave it a score of 70 out of 100 for each of the three platform releases.

GameSpot said: "For all its minor faults and bare-bones nature in comparison to others, WRC 7 is still an enjoyable, but seriously challenging rally title. It's not the most welcoming game for newcomers, and even experienced racers will find some of the rougher stages tricky."

The game won the award for "Best Sports Game" at the 2017 Ping Awards.

References

External links 
 

Video games developed in France
World Rally Championship video games
PlayStation 4 games
Windows games
Xbox One games
Multiplayer and single-player video games
Multiplayer online games
Kylotonn games
Split-screen multiplayer games
2017 video games
Esports games
Nacon games